Jeffrey Neil Steenson PA (born April 1, 1952) is an American retired priest and prelate of the Catholic Church and a former bishop of the Episcopal Church within the Anglican Communion. Steenson was the first ordinary of the Personal Ordinariate of the Chair of Saint Peter which was established for former Anglicans who have become Catholics. He was previously the bishop of the Episcopal Diocese of the Rio Grande from 2005 to 2007, when he resigned and was received into full communion with the Catholic Church.

Education
Steenson earned a B.A. from Trinity International University in 1974, an M.A. in church history from Trinity Evangelical Divinity School in 1976, and an M.Div. from Harvard Divinity School in 1978. He went on to earn a D.Phil. from the University of Oxford in 1983 with a dissertation entitled "Basil of Ancyra and the Course of Nicene Orthodoxy".

Episcopal Church ministry
Steenson was ordained as a priest of the Episcopal Church on June 29, 1980, and became a curate at All Saints' Church in Wynnewood, Pennsylvania, and later the rector of the Church of the Good Shepherd (Rosemont, Pennsylvania), and then St. Andrew's Church in Fort Worth, Texas.

In October 2004, Steenson was elected coadjutor bishop of the Episcopal Diocese of the Rio Grande; he was consecrated on January 16, 2005. On August 1, 2005, he succeeded Terrence Kelshaw as Bishop of Rio Grande. Steenson was a member of the Board of Trustees of Nashotah House and the Board of Directors of The Living Church Foundation.

In September 2007, Steenson announced his decision to resign as bishop, effective December 1.

Roman Catholic ministry
Steenson was received into the full communion of the Catholic Church on December 1, 2007. Having petitioned for ordination in the Catholic Church under the Pastoral Provision, he began studies at the Pontifical Irish College in Rome.

Steenson was ordained a transitional deacon in December 2008 by Cardinal Bernard Law, the archpriest of the Basilica of St. Mary Major in Rome. On February 21, 2009, he was ordained a priest for the Archdiocese of Santa Fe by Archbishop Michael J. Sheehan, at St. Thomas Aquinas Church in Rio Rancho, New Mexico.

Steenson has taught at the University of Dallas (Rome campus), the University of St. Thomas in Houston, and at St. Mary's Seminary, also in Houston.

On January 1, 2012, Pope Benedict XVI named Steenson the first ordinary of the newly created Personal Ordinariate of the Chair of Saint Peter. He was installed as ordinary on February 12, 2012.  Upon his appointment as ordinary, Steenson was granted the title protonotary apostolic, the highest rank of monsignor, by Pope Benedict XVI. Being married, Steenson is not eligible to be consecrated a Catholic bishop, but due to his position as ordinary, he was a full voting member of the United States Conference of Catholic Bishops. At its founding, the ordinariate was said to have inquiries from over 100 Anglican priests and 1,400 people. Steenson resigned from the office of ordinary on November 24, 2015. His successor, Steven J. Lopes, was appointed on the same day.

After resigning from the office of ordinary, Steenson began teaching at the Saint Paul Seminary School of Divinity. He was the scholar-in-residence for two years, teaching classes on Patristics and Holy Orders, as well as serving as a formation director. He retired from this position in 2018.

Personal life
Steenson is married to Debra Jane Steenson, with whom he has three adult children. He is an avid amateur pilot and aircraft builder.

See also
Historical list of the Episcopal bishops of the United States
List of the Catholic bishops of the United States#Personal Ordinariate of the Chair of Saint Peter

References

External links

1952 births
Living people
Alumni of Christ Church, Oxford
American Roman Catholic priests
Anglican bishop converts to Roman Catholicism
Harvard Divinity School alumni
Trinity Evangelical Divinity School alumni
Pontifical Irish College alumni
Trinity International University alumni
People from Fort Rucker, Alabama
University of Dallas faculty
Married Roman Catholic clergy
People of the personal ordinariates
American Anglo-Catholics
Anglo-Catholic bishops
Catholics from Alabama
Episcopal bishops of the Rio Grande
Anglican realignment people
University of St. Thomas (Texas) faculty